Norman Sharp (15 April 1901 – 14 July 1977) was an English cricketer who made one appearance in first-class cricket in 1923. He played as a right-handed batsman.

Sharp made his only appearance in first-class cricket when he was selected to play for Warwickshire against Worcestershire in the County Championship at Edgbaston. He batted just once in the match, which Warwickshire won by 7 wickets, scoring 3 runs from the lower-order, before being dismissed bowled by Leslie Gale.

He died at Sutton Coldfield, Warwickshire on 14 July 1977.

References

External links
Norman Sharp at ESPNcricinfo
Norman Sharp at CricketArchive

1901 births
1977 deaths
Cricketers from Derby
English cricketers
Warwickshire cricketers